Arzhan is a site of early Scythian kurgan burials in the Tuva Republic, Russia, some  northwest of Kyzyl. It is on a high plateau traversed by the Uyuk River, a minor tributary of the Yenisei River, in the region of Tuva.

The "Arzhan culture" is considered as forming the initial Scythian period (8th–7th century BC), and precedes the Pazyryk culture. The remains of Arzhan are among the earliest of all known Scythian cultures, which has led to suggestions that it is the origin of the Scythian "Animal Style".

Arzhan kurgan
Arzhan-1 was excavated by M. P. Gryaznov in the 1970s, establishing the origins of Scythian culture in the region in the 9th to 8th centuries BCE. Further excavations were conducted in 1997 and in 1998-2003 (Arzhan-2). The excavations showed burials with rich grave goods including horses and gold artifacts. There are several hundred kurgans, arranged in parallel chains.

Arzhan-2 turned out to be an undisturbed burial; the builders created two central pits that were fake graves to throw off looters, and the main burial was 20 meters off-center. It was first explored by a joint German and Russian archaeological expedition from 2000 to 2004. They found the royal couple, sixteen murdered attendants, and 9,300 objects. 5,700 of these artifacts were made of gold, weighing a Siberian record-breaking twenty kilograms. The male, who researchers guess was some sort of king, wore a golden torc, a jacket decorated with 2,500 golden panther figurines, a gold-encrusted dagger on a belt, trousers sewn with golden beads, and gold-cuffed boots. The woman wore a red cloak that was also covered in 2,500 golden panther figurines, as well as a golden-hilted iron dagger, a gold comb, and a wooden ladle with a golden handle. The couple was buried together, suggesting that the woman was killed to keep the king company in the afterlife. The tomb also had thousands of beads, including over four hundred made of Baltic amber.

In 2017, the large royal burial mound Tunnug 1 (Arzhan 0), which dates to the same period as Arzhan-1, was investigated by a Russian-Swiss expedition.

Significance
Arzhan has been a key element in archaeological evidence that now tends to suggest that the origins of Scythian culture, characterized by its kurgan burial mounds and its Animal style of the 1st millennium BC, are to be found among Eastern Scythians rather than their Western counterparts: eastern kurgans are older than western ones (such as the Altaic kurgan Arzhan 1 in Tuva), and elements of the Animal style are first attested in areas of the Yenisei river and modern-day China in the 10th century BCE. The rapid spread of Scythian culture, from the Eastern Scythians to the Western Scythians, is also confirmed by significant east-to-west gene flow across the steppes during the 1st millennium BC.

Genetics 
In 2019, a genetic study of remains from the Aldy-Bel culture was published in Human Genetics. The authors determined the paternal haplogroups of 16 Aldy Bel males. 9 out of 16 samples (56.25%) were found to be carriers of the West Eurasian haplogroup R1a, while 7 samples (43.75%) belonged to the East Eurasian haplogroups Q-L54 and N-M231.  

The authors also analyzed the maternal haplogroups of 26 Siberian Scythian remains from Arzhan. 50% of the remains carried an East Eurasian haplogroup including C, D, F and G, while 50% carried West Eurasian haplogroups H, U, or T. In contrast to the paternal lineages, the maternal lineages were extremely diverse. The most common lineages were variants of haplogroup C4.

Significant paternal genetic differences were found between the Eastern Scythians and the Scythians of the Pontic-Caspian steppe. The two groups were of completely different paternal origins, with almost no paternal gene flow between them. On the other hand, there is strong evidence of shared maternal DNA between Scythian cultures, indicating maternal geneflow from East Euraisa to West Eurasia. 

Another analysis of population ancestry suggested that Aldy Bel Scythians were of roughly 60% West Eurasian ancestry and 40% East Eurasian ancestry.

Artefacts

See also
Aldy-Bel culture
Srubna culture
Andronovo culture
Karasuk culture

Further reading
Konstantin Čugunov, Hermann Parzinger, Anatoli Nagler: Der skythische Fürstengrabhügel von Aržan 2 in Tuva. Vorbericht der russisch-deutschen Ausgrabungen 2000-2002. In: Eurasia Antiqua 9 (2003), S. 113-162
А. Д. Грач. "Древние кочевники в центре Азии." Москва 1980.
M. P. Gryaznov: Der Großkurgan von Aržan in Tuva, Südsibirien. Materialien zur Allgemeinen und Vergleichenden Archäologie 23. München 1984
А. М. Мандельштам.  "Ранние кочевники скифского периода на территории Тувы."  В М. Г. Мошкова, "Степная полоса азиатской части СССР в скифо-сарматское время".  Археология СССР.  Москва 1992

References

External links
Arzhan - a Scythian royal necropolis in Tuva, Southern Siberia
Archaeology in Tuva – Scythian Gold From Siberia Said to Predate the Greeks

Archaeological sites in Russia
Archaeological sites in Siberia
Kurgans
Iranian archaeological sites
Iron Age sites in Asia
Geography of Tuva
Saka
Cultural heritage monuments in Tuva
Objects of cultural heritage of Russia of federal significance